Toby Wing (born Martha Virginia Wing, July 14, 1915 – March 22, 2001), "Toby" being an old family nickname, was an American actress and showgirl, once called "the most beautiful chorus girl in Hollywood".

Early years
Wing was born in Amelia Court House, Virginia, to Paul Wing and Martha Thraves. Her father, a career reserve Army officer, was an assistant director for Paramount Pictures. He was reactivated for service prior to World War II and was captured by the Japanese and survived the Bataan Death March.

She had a sister, Pat Wing (real name Gertrude), who also worked as an actress (often in the chorus), as well as a younger brother. Her great-uncle was English playwright Sir Arthur Wing Pinero.

Career
Wing began working on-screen at age 9, having a few bit parts in silent movies through her father's job. In 1931, she became one of the first Goldwyn Girls, and she started her film career in Palmy Days (1932). In 1932, she was seen in Mack Sennett-produced comedies made by Paramount, one starring Bing Crosby. Wing made an impression with producers and moviegoers, but she seldom broke through to leading roles.

Many of her roles were small and barely clothed, before the introduction of the 1934 Production Code; she became widely recognized as a sex symbol; once being described as the most beautiful chorus girl in all of Hollywood. Since her contracted studio was mired in bankruptcy during much of her career, her work was done on loan, primarily at Warner Bros., and later after her release, on low-budget efforts on a per-film basis. Wing enjoyed a far more successful sideline doing product endorsements and was featured in innumerable fan magazines from 1933–1938. 

Wing played a few leading roles in B features and short subjects. In 1936 and 1937, she worked opposite singer-songwriter Pinky Tomlin in two of his low-budget musical features, With Love and Kisses and Sing While You're Able. 

Her last leading role was in The Marines Come Thru. Although filmed in Florida in 1938, it did not see general release until 1943 as Fight On, Marines! Wing completed her acting career on Broadway in the unsuccessful 1938 Cole Porter musical You Never Know, which starred Lupe Vélez, Clifton Webb, Libby Holman, and J. Harold Murray.

On February 8, 1960, Wing was honored with a star on the Hollywood Walk of Fame located at 6561 Hollywood Boulevard.

Personal life
She was well known off-screen for her romances, and was linked to Jackie Coogan (to whom she was engaged during much of 1935), Maurice Chevalier, Alfred Vanderbilt, Franklin Roosevelt Jr. and others. Wing and Pinky Tomlin were engaged briefly during late 1937, with the romance ending before their planned wedding, and they remained close until Tomlin's death. 

She married the pilot Henry "Dick" Merrill via elopement to Tijuana when she was 22, he being more than 20 years her senior, on October 19, 1938 in Fredericksburg, Virginia. She retired from movies after marrying.

The couple had two sons; both predeceased their parents. Their first son died of what was then termed "crib death" and their second son Ricky, was murdered in their Miami home in September 1982, at age 42. His murder occurred while he was out on bail pending an appeal for a New Orleans marijuana-smuggling conviction.  the case remained unsolved. 

The couple retired to DiLido, Florida, where Merrill was assigned Eastern Airlines' New York-Miami route for the remainder of his career. Wing became successful in real estate in California and Florida. They later settled in Virginia, where Merrill managed the Shannon Air Museum in Fredericksburg until his death in 1982. She is interred in Christ Church Kingston Parish Cemetery in Mathews County, Virginia.  The couple was survived by two granddaughters.

Filmography
Features:

A Boy of Flanders (1924) - Little Girl (uncredited)
A Woman Who Sinned (1924) - (uncredited)
Circe, the Enchantress (1924) - Little Girl (uncredited)
He Who Gets Slapped (1924) - Playing Child (uncredited)
Percy (1925) - Little Girl (uncredited)
 The Shining Adventure (1925) - Little Girl (uncredited)
Zander the Great (1925) - Little Girl (uncredited)
Marry Me (1925) - Little Girl (uncredited)
The Pony Express (1925) - Child (uncredited)
American Pluck (1925) - Flower Girl at Coronation (uncredited)
Dollar Down (1925) - Little Girl
Double Daring (1926) - Nan
Palmy Days (1931) - Goldwyn Girl (uncredited)
The Kid from Spain (1932) - Goldwyn Girl (uncredited)
The King's Vacation (1933) - Autograph Seeker at Casino (uncredited)
42nd Street (1933) - Blonde in 'Young and Healthy' Number (uncredited)
The Little Giant (1933) - Society Girl (uncredited)
Central Airport (1933) - Air Show Observer (uncredited)
Private Detective 62 (1933) - Free's Girl Friend (uncredited)
College Humor (1933) - Student (uncredited)
It's Great to Be Alive (1933) - Blonde that Kisses Carlos (uncredited)
Baby Face (1933) - Office Worker (uncredited)
She Had to Say Yes (1933) - Model (uncredited)
Arizona to Broadway (1933) - Chambermaid (uncredited)
This Day and Age (1933) - Student (uncredited)
Torch Singer (1933) - Blonde in Sally's apartment (uncredited)
Search for Beauty (1934) - Sally Palmer
School for Girls (1934) - Hazel Jones
Come on Marines (1934) - Dolly
Murder at the Vanities (1934) - Nancy
Kiss and Make-Up (1934) - Consuelo of Claghorne
Student Tour (1934) - Student (uncredited)
One Hour Late (1934) - Maizie
Two for Tonight (1935) - College Girl (uncredited)
Forced Landing (1935) - Amelie Darrell
Thoroughbred (1936) - Anne O'Malley
Mr. Cinderella (1936) - Lulu, the Cashier
With Love and Kisses (1936) - Barbara Holbrook
Silks and Saddles (1936) - Marion Braddock / Jane Smith
Sing While You're Able (1937) - Joan Williams
The Women Men Marry (1937) - Sugar
True Confession (1937) - Suzanne Baggart
Mr. Boggs Steps Out (1938) - Irene Lee
The Marines Come Thru (1938) - Linda Dale
Sweethearts (1938) - Telephone Operator (uncredited)

Short Subjects:

Jimmy's New Yacht (1932) - One of Charlie's Girlfriends
The Loud Mouth (1932) - Nurse (uncredited)
The Candid Camera (1932) - Betty Swan
Alaska Love (1932) - Blonde by River (uncredited)
Ma's Pride and Joy (1932) - Radio Director's Secretary
Blue of the Night (1933) - Blonde in Bathing Suit (uncredited)
Rhythm on the Roof (1934) - Bob's Fantasy Sweetheart
Star Night at the Cocoanut Grove (1934) - Herself
Hollywood Extra Girl (1935)
La Fiesta de Santa Barbara (1935) - Herself
Hill-Tillies (1936) - Toby
Rhythmitis (1936) - Lola Green
Sunday Night at the Trocadero (1937) - Toby Wing

References

External links

 
 
 Photographs
 

1915 births
2001 deaths
American film actresses
American child actresses
American silent film actresses
People from Amelia, Virginia
Actresses from Virginia
20th-century American actresses